The Claire S. Copley Gallery was a Los Angeles gallery on La Cienega Boulevard that existed from 1973-1977. Together with the galleries of Eugenia Butler, Rolf Nelson, Nick Wilder, and Riko Mizuno, the Claire Copley Gallery played an important role in the Los Angeles art scene of the 1960s and 1970s. The gallery provided a venue for emerging American and European minimalist and Conceptual artists, among them Bas Jan Ader, Terry Allen, Michael Asher, Daniel Buren, Jan Dibbets, Ger Van Elk, On Kawara, Joseph Kosuth, David Lamelas, William Leavitt, Allan McCollum, Allen Ruppersberg, and William Wegman.

History 
The Claire S. Copley Gallery was featured along with two other women-owned galleries (those of Eugenia Butler and Riko Mizuno) in a 2011 exhibition at the Crossroads School's Sam Francis Gallery, part of the Pacific Standard Time collaborative initiative organized by the Getty and featuring Los Angeles art from 1945-1980.

Copley's invitation to Michael Asher to launch his first American solo show in her space resulted in the work that the gallery may be best known for, the 1974 Installation where Asher removed the separating wall between the exhibition space and the back room storage and office areas.  In addition, Asher intentionally left the walls of the gallery itself completely blank. According to Asher,  "The idea was to integrate the two areas, so that  the office area and  its activities could be viewed  from  the exhibition area, and  the exhibition area opened to the  gallery directors' view." By exposing the gallery owner to viewers and viewers to the owner and without any additional art on display, Asher deliberately brought forth the usually hidden relationships existing between them.

By championing artists like Asher, Copley and other gallery owners at the time sought to challenge the reign of market forces by exhibiting works that couldn't be bought or sold. This stance in no small part led to the closing of the Copley Gallery after only a few years and to Copley's founding, along with Morgan Thomas and Connie Lewallen, of the non-profit Foundation for Art Resources, a non-profit organization dedicated to exhibiting unconventional work in public spaces.

References

External links
 She Accepts the Proposition: Women Gallerists and the Redefinition of Art in Los Angeles, 1967-1978
 Claire S. Copley Gallery, from Pacific Standard Time Archive
 [ History Lesson: A View from Here], from 2008, FAR: Foundation for Art Resources
 Getty Museum, Claire Copley Gallery records [6] 

Defunct art museums and galleries in California
Art museums and galleries in Los Angeles
Art galleries established in 1973